Luis Alfredo Vila (born March 6, 1992 in Bahía Blanca (Buenos Aires), Argentina) is an Argentine footballer who plays for Club Olimpo.

Career

Teams
 River Plate 2011-2013
 Everton 2013–present

Titles
 River Plate 2012 (Copa Libertadores U-20)

References

External links
 
 

1992 births
Living people
Argentine footballers
Argentine expatriate footballers
Association football forwards
Sportspeople from Bahía Blanca
Club Atlético River Plate footballers
Everton de Viña del Mar footballers
C.D. Olmedo footballers
Godoy Cruz Antonio Tomba footballers
Gimnasia y Esgrima de Jujuy footballers
Olimpo footballers
NK Istra 1961 players
Delfín S.C. footballers
Guayaquil City F.C. footballers
Club Almagro players
Club y Biblioteca Ramón Santamarina footballers
Chilean Primera División players
Argentine Primera División players
Primera Nacional players
Ecuadorian Serie A players
Croatian Football League players
Argentine expatriate sportspeople in Chile
Argentine expatriate sportspeople in Ecuador
Argentine expatriate sportspeople in Croatia
Expatriate footballers in Chile
Expatriate footballers in Ecuador
Expatriate footballers in Croatia